Sushmita Mitra is an Indian computer scientist and is currently the head and INAE Chair Professor at the Machine Intelligence Unit at Indian Statistical Institute, Kolkata. Her research interests include pattern recognition, data mining, bioinformatics, soft computing and medical imaging. She got recognised as a fellow of IEEE for her neuro-fuzzy and hybrid approaches in pattern recognition.

Early life and education 
Born to Dr. Maya Mitra, a professor of botany at Bethune College in Kolkata, and Dr. Girindra Nath Mitra, a scientist with Indian Council of Agricultural Research (ICAR). She did her ISC from Calcutta Girls’ High School and her ICSE from Auxilium Convent School. In her high school, she was also awarded National Talent Search Scholarship by National Council for Educational Research and Training (NCERT) which continued till her master's-level education (1978–1983). Then she studied physics honours in Presidency College, under the guidance of  Prof. Amal Raychaudhuri and Prof. Shyamal Sengupta. She did secure an admission to B.Tech in Computer Science of Rajabazar Science College, University of Calcutta after that and she also cleared the entrance test for Integrated five-year M.E. course of Indian Institute of Science. But she wasn't able to leave her mother for studies after the recent demise of her father. Consequently, she met the renowned Prof. Arun Choudhury who taught her the basics of electrical circuits.

She ranked first in her undergraduate degree, she gained admission to M.Tech. in IIT Kharagpur by clearing GATE examination. She took admission at the university. However, in an autobiographical essay, she wrote of feeling homesick and finding it difficult to leave her mother alone. So, she came back and went for M.Tech in the Science college campus of University of Calcutta, where she ranked first and was awarded the University Gold Medal for her performance.

After her M.Tech., she took up a project assistantship at Indian Statistical Institute on the topic of pattern recognition under Dr. Sankar K. Pal. She received the CSIR Senior Research Fellowship to work on her Ph.D in Neuro-Fuzzy Pattern Recognition under the supervision of Prof. Sankar K. Pal in 1989.

In 1992, she was selected for the DAAD fellowship to work with Prof. H. J. Zimmermann in RWTH Aachen University in Germany from 1992-1994.

She completed her Ph.D. in computer science from ISI in 1995. She started working there in 1991 and has risen up the academic ladder to the level of a full professor.

Career and research 
She received IEEE Neural Networks Council Outstanding Paper Award in 1994 and the CIMPA-INRIA-UNESCO Fellowship in 1996 for her pioneering work on neuro fuzzy computing and its generic hybridisation with other soft computing 5 paradigms. On recommendation of one of her Ph.D. examiners, she authored a book based on her publication - Neuro Fuzzy Pattern Recognition: Methods in Soft Computing. Her research also resulted in several fellowships - which includes those of IEEE, Indian National Science Academy (INSA), International Association for Pattern Recognition (IAPR), Indian National Academy of Engineering (INAE) and The National Academy of Sciences, India (NASI). She has written some other books as well like Data Mining: Multimedia, Soft Computing, and Bioinformatics; and Introduction to Machine Learning and Bioinformatics.

Mitra was a visiting professor in the Computer Science Departments of University of Alberta, Edmonton, Canada in 2004, 2007. She also visited Meiji University, Japan in 1999, 2004, 2005, 2007; and Aalborg University, Esbjerg, Denmark in 2002, 2003. She has also been associated with the editorial activity of several international journals, and have chaired many international conferences. Dr. Mitra has guest edited special issues of several; is an Associate Editor of “IEEE/ACM Trans. on Computational Biology and Bioinformatics”, “Information Sciences”, “Neurocomputing”, “Fundamenta Informatica”, and is a Founding Associate Editor of “Wiley Interdisciplinary Reviews: Data Mining and Knowledge Discovery (WIRE DMKD)”.

Two of her research papers have been ranked 3rd and 15th in the list of top-cited papers in Engineering Science from India during 1992-2001, according to the Science Citation Index (SCI). “Gesture Recognition: A Survey” along with Dr. Tinku Acharya is her most cited publication (around 1900 citations). There are more than 150 research publications in her name in refereed international journals. For the period 2014-2016, Dr. Mitra was an IEEE CIS Distinguished Lecturer. She is the current Chair, IEEE CIS Kolkata Chapter. She has visited more than 30 countries as a Plenary/Invited Speaker or an academic visitor. She served in the capacity of Program Chair, Tutorial Chair, and as member of programme committees of many international conferences.

References 

 Indian Statistical Institute faculty profile
 Google Scholar Citations page

Fellow Members of the IEEE
Living people
Year of birth missing (living people)
Scientists from West Bengal
Indian computer scientists